Monica Sharma (born 15 September 1992) is an Indian model, television & film actress. She appeared in the Colors TV show Shrimad Bhagwat Mahapuran as the goddess Ganga.

Early life
Monica was born 15 September 1992 in New Delhi. She got her education from Happy Model School, Janakpuri, New Delhi.

Career
In 2014, she entered Indian Princess beauty contest where she was titled Miss Grand India 2014 and was chosen to represent India at Miss Grand International held in Bangkok, Thailand, where she placed in the Top 20 at the Best National Costume competition of the contest.

In 2015, Sharma began her television career with &TV's Dilli Wali Thakur Gurls. Her next show was Colors TV's Naagin 2 where she portrayed a supporting role. In 2018, she starred in Colors TV's Sasural Simar Ka and made an episodic appearance in the channel's horror supernatural thriller Kaun Hai?. Sharma next played cameo roles in Star Plus's Kasautii Zindagii Kay and &TV's Vikram Betaal Ki Rahasya Gatha. In April 2019, she was offered to enter Star Bharat's Pyaar Ke Papad.
In 2019 she played the role of Shivika in ek ichadhari ki dastaan on Dangal TV in a lead role.

Television

Movies

References

External links 
 

Living people
Actresses from New Delhi
Beauty pageant contestants from India
Indian beauty pageant winners
Indian television actresses
Indian soap opera actresses
21st-century Indian actresses
Female models from Delhi
1992 births